Sveti Pavel  is a novel by Slovenian author Pavle Zidar. It was first published in 1965.

See also
List of Slovenian novels

Slovenian novels
1965 novels